The Fifth Doctor Adventures is a Big Finish Productions audio play series based on the television series Doctor Who. It sees the return of Peter Davison reprising his role as the Fifth Doctor.

History
In 1999, beginning with the story "The Sirens of Time", Big Finish Productions began producing a series of audio adventures featuring the Fifth Doctor, Sixth Doctor and Seventh Doctor. For 22 years these stories continued collectively known as Big Finish's "Main Range". In May 2020, Big Finish announced the main range would conclude in March 2021 and subsequently replaced with regular releases of each Doctor's adventures continuing in their own respective ranges. Several previously released special titles were retroactively reallocated into these new ranges by Big Finish.

Cast and characters

Notable Guests
 Caroline Morris as Erimem
 Mark Donovan as  Shayde

Episodes

Specials

The Fifth Doctor Box Set (2014)

Wicked Sisters (2020)

The Lost Resort and Other Stories (2021)

Forty (2022)

Conflicts of Interest

In the Night

Awards and nominations

References

Audio plays based on Doctor Who
Big Finish Productions
Doctor Who spin-offs
Fifth Doctor audio plays